Antonio Fernández de Córdoba y Cardona, 5th Duke of Sessa (2 December 1550 – 6 January 1606), was a Spanish nobleman. He held the titles of Duke of Sessa, Duke of Soma, and Duke of Baena, among others.

Lineage
Antonio Fernández de Córdoba y Cardona was born in Bellpuig, Catalonia, the son of Fernando Folch de Cardona Anglesola y Requesens, 2nd Duke of Soma, 2nd count of Oliveto, 3rd count of Palamós, 3rd count of Trivento, 3rd count of Avellino,  6th barón of Bellpuig, Calonge, Liñola and Uxafavá, and Great Admiral of Naples. Antonio's mother was Beatriz de Figueroa, a daughter of Elvira Fernández de Córdoba y Manrique, the 2nd duchess of Sessa and the 2nd duchess of five other duchies won by her father, Gonzalo Fernández de Córdoba.

Although Beatriz would normally have borne the surname Fernández de Córdoba, she preferred to be known as Beatriz de Figueroa in honour of her maternal grandmother, whose surnames were Manrique de Lara and Figueroa. This practice of using a surname belonging to an ancestor, rather than the paternally inherited surname, was not unusual among the Spanish nobility of the time. Antonio's name was also affected by this practice. Ordinarily he would have been a Folch de Cardona, inheriting his father's surname, but his parents instead decided to give him the Fernández de Córdoba name, in memory of his famous ancestor, Gonzalo Fernández de Córdoba.

Beatriz died a nun in Barcelona in 1553, and Fernando died at Naples on 13 September 1571. Antonio's only brother Luis died in March 1574, and thereafter, Antonio inherited all their titles as 4th Duke of Soma, 5th consort Duke of Sessa, 3rd Duke of Baena, 7th Count of Cabra, plus many other counties and viscounties in Catalonia and in Italy as described above with other ancestors.

Career
Fernández de Córdoba was the Spanish ambassador in Rome between 1590 and 1604, serving under Philip II and Philip III of Spain. He was also head of protocol for Queen Consort Margaret of Austria and a Knight and Commander at the Military Order of Calatrava. While in Rome, he was visited by the Flemish painter Peter Paul Rubens.

Marriage
Fernandez de Córdoba married Juana de Córdoba Cardona y Aragón in Torà, Catalunya, on 19 June 1578. She was the eldest daughter of Diego Fernández de Córdoba, 3rd marquis of Comares, Governor General of Oran and Mazalquivir. Her mother was duchess Juana II Folch de Cardona, 4th Duke of Cardona, countess of Ampurias, countess of Prades, marchioness of Pallars.

Juana de Córdoba Cardona y Aragón died in 1634.  Antonio died, aged 55, in Valladolid, Spain.

Descendants
The descendants of Antonio Fernández de Córdoba y Cardona were given various combinations of surnames, such as Córdoba, Fernández de Córdoba, and Folch de Cardona, according to convenience or the whims of their families, making their genealogy difficult to follow. One such descendant was a Córdoba woman married to an Irish count from the Sullivan family, who was exiled to Madrid and assassinated there in 1618.

The marriage of Antonio and Juana produced two male children:

Luis Fernández de Córdoba, (1582–1642), 6th Duke of Sessa, 4th Duke of Baena and many other titles, patron of the famous theatrical writer, Felix Lope de Vega.
Gonzalo Fernández de Córdoba (1585–1635), Governor of the Duchy of Milan (1625–1629), 1st Prince of Maratea, Sicily (1624), Prince of the Holy Roman Empire (1625) by Holy Roman Emperor Ferdinand II. He was single and had no issue.

References
grandesp.org.uk—dead 14:30, 14 May 2020 (UTC)

1550 births
1606 deaths
105
Ambassadors of Spain to the Holy See
Dukes of Spain